Miguel Cobas Obarrio (born 14 July 1977) is a Spanish retired footballer who played as a midfielder.

A product of the Sporting de Gijón's prolific youth setup, Cobas amassed 189 matches and only three goals in Segunda División. An injury-prone player, he retired in June 2009 with UD Las Palmas, after suffering a serious knee injury.

References

External links
 
 

1977 births
Living people
People from Avilés
Spanish footballers
Footballers from Asturias
Association football midfielders
Segunda División players
Segunda División B players
Sporting de Gijón B players
Sporting de Gijón players
Racing de Ferrol footballers
UD Las Palmas players